General transcription factor IIH subunit 1 is a protein that in humans is encoded by the GTF2H1 gene.

Interactions 

GTF2H1 has been shown to interact with:

 Cyclin-dependent kinase 7, 
 E2F1, 
 ERCC2, 
 Estrogen receptor alpha, 
 TCEA1, and
 XPB.

See also 
 Transcription Factor II H

References

Further reading

External links 
 
 

Transcription factors